Ryan Justin Steed (born July 21, 1990) is a former American football cornerback. He was signed by the New York Jets as an undrafted free agent in 2012. He played college football at Furman University.

Early life
The son of Ernest Steed and Lisa King, Steed was born July 21, 1990 in Charleston, South Carolina. He attended Pinewood Preparatory School in Summerville, South Carolina, where he played both basketball and football. His basketball team achieved three SCISA AAA state championships. In football, where he played multiple positions, Steed was distinguished in his senior year by the Charleston Post and Courier as "all-region" for their All-Lowcountry Football second-team. In the North Carolina-South Carolina Shrine All-Star Classic game, Steed was dubbed "Defensive Player of the Game".

Collegiate career
Steed played college football for Furman University. In 2011, he was named 1st team FCS All-American by the Associated Press and the American Football Coaches Association. He was also selected to play in the 2012 Senior Bowl. He earned 1st team All-Southern Conference as a sophomore, junior and senior.

Professional career

New York Jets
Steed was signed as an undrafted free agent by the New York Jets on April 29, 2012. He was waived on August 29, 2012.

New Orleans Saints
Steed was signed to the New Orleans Saints' practice squad on December 19, 2012.

On July 23, 2013, Steed was waived by the New Orleans Saints.

Pittsburgh Steelers
On July 30, 2013, Steed was signed by the Pittsburgh Steelers as a free agent. On August 25, 2013, he was cut by the Steelers.

Calgary Stampeders
Steed was signed by the Stampeders on March 25, 2014 and released on July 11, 2014.

Saskatchewan Roughriders
Steed signed with the Saskatchewan Roughriders in October 2014.

References

External links
Furman Paladins bio
New York Jets bio
Saskatchewan Roughriders bio

1990 births
Living people
Sportspeople from Charleston, South Carolina
Players of American football from South Carolina
African-American players of American football
American football cornerbacks
Furman University alumni
Furman Paladins football players
New York Jets players
New Orleans Saints players
Pittsburgh Steelers players
21st-century African-American sportspeople